Danielle Bregoli (born March 26, 2003), known professionally as Bhad Bhabie ("bad baby"), is an American rapper and internet personality. She first became known from an appearance on Dr. Phil in September 2016, in which she uttered the phrase, "Cash [sic] me outside, how 'bout that?", which became a viral video meme and catchphrase.

In 2017, Bregoli became the youngest female rapper ever to appear on the Billboard Hot 100 chart with her debut single "These Heaux". She subsequently signed a record deal with Atlantic Records and has since expanded into a reality show, a makeup brand, tours, and a music career. Bregoli released her first mixtape, 15, in September 2018. Its lead single, "Hi Bich," became her second single to appear on the Billboard Hot 100 chart.

Life and career

2003–2015: Early life and background
Bregoli was born and raised in Boynton Beach, Florida. Her parents, Ira Peskowitz and Barbara Ann Bregoli, dated for a year before Barbara became pregnant, later separating when she was an infant. She is of Ashkenazi Jewish descent through her father and Italian descent through her mother. Bregoli was raised in a Catholic household primarily by her mother and is estranged from her father, a deputy who works for the Palm Beach County Sheriff's Office. Through her father, she has two younger half-brothers.

2016–2017: Dr. Phil appearance, rehab, and legal issues

On September 14, 2016, Bregoli and her mother Barbara Ann were interviewed on Dr. Phil for a segment titled "I Want to Give Up My Car-Stealing, Knife-Wielding, Twerking 13-Year-Old Daughter Who Tried to Frame Me for a Crime." They appeared on the show to discuss Bregoli's behavior, which included stealing a crew member's car while the episode was being filmed. When Bregoli became irritated at the audience's laughter, she responded to them by saying "Catch me outside, how about that?", challenging them to a fight outside the studio. Her affected accent made the phrase sound like "Cash me ousside, how bout dah," which became a meme, and Bregoli became known as the "'Cash Me Outside' Girl." On February 10, 2017, Bregoli reappeared on the show, but without a studio audience due to the response at her previous appearance. Her first appearance on the show, and the catchphrase it spawned, would inspire a single based on the clip ("Cash Me Outside") which was recorded by DJ Suede The Remix God and entered the Billboard Hot 100, Streaming Songs, and Hot R&B/Hip-Hop Songs charts in its March 4, 2017 issue. The song, in turn, led to a series of dance videos that were uploaded onto YouTube.

Bregoli and her mother sued three companies for "infringing her intellectual property rights" by using her signature catchphrase without consent. She also threatened to sue Walmart for using her catchphrase on T-shirts. She was nominated for the 2017 MTV Movie & TV Awards in the "Trending" category based on the catchphrase.

Following her appearance on Dr. Phil, Bregoli spent time at the Turn-About Ranch, a facility for "troubled teens" in Escalante, Utah. She was later arrested and pleaded guilty to charges of grand theft, marijuana possession, and filing a false police report, for which she was sentenced to five years' probation in July 2017, but the probation ended earlier in March 2018 after she hired a new lawyer. In March 2021, Bregoli uploaded a video to her YouTube channel in which she says she experienced and witnessed abuse at the Turn-About Ranch. She accused staffers of forcing her to sit still for three days straight without being allowed to sleep, using physical restraint on other teenagers, and ignoring reports of bullying. She also criticized Dr. Phil for sending teenagers on his show to the facility. He responded via an April 2021 interview with NewsNation that he is unaware of the ranch's actions and does not get feedback from them, to which Bregoli reacted by saying in a second video that the ranch sends progress reports directly to the show.

2017–2018: Career beginnings, and 15 
In early 2017, Bregoli was signed by music manager Adam Kluger and initially received industry backlash.

By March 2017, Bregoli's personal worth was estimated to be $200,000.

Bregoli released her first single "These Heaux" (pronounced "hoes") on August 24, 2017. The recording reached number 77 on the Billboard Hot 100, making Bregoli the youngest female rap artist to debut on the music chart. The success of "These Heaux" prompted Atlantic Records to sign Bregoli to a multi-album recording contract. In September 2017, she remixed the Kodak Black song "Roll in Peace" and Tee Grizzley and Lil Yachty song "From the D to the A". On September 22, 2017, she released "Hi Bich" which reached number 17 on the Billboard Hot 100 and a day after, "Whachu Know", as a single alongside the video, which received over 3 million views in 24 hours. After a shorter break, on November 30, 2017, she released another single "I Got It", followed by "Mama Don't Worry (Still Ain't Dirty)" in December. In the latter, she's rapping about her past, and that her appearance in Dr. Phil should be forgotten. This theme is echoed in the video for "Both of Em", in which she buries her old self in a shallow grave. In "Hi Bich (Remix)" she collaborates for the first time with other artists, including YBN Nahmir, Rich the Kid and Asian Doll (in the video, YBN Nahmir was replaced by MadeinTYO for unknown reasons).

On March 26, 2018, she celebrated her birthday with a new song release, "Gucci Flip Flops", featuring Lil Yachty. Two days later, she received a gold certification from the RIAA for her single "Hi Bich". In mid-April, she released a freestyle called "Who Run It".

Her first tour across North America and Europe, together with Asian Doll, began on April 14, 2018, performing the first and second legs.

On May 2, 2018, the video for "Gucci Flip Flops" was released. Following the video's release, the song became a worldwide hit. It debuted on Billboard's Hot 100 Chart at number 80 and peaked at 79, becoming her third charting single on the chart. She received a 2018 Billboard Music Award nomination in the category of Best Female Rap Artist, along with Cardi B and Nicki Minaj.

On June 14, 2018, Bregoli released another single "Trust Me" featuring Ty Dolla Sign. On July 26, she released the video for "Trust Me", featuring guest appearances from Theo Von and Bella Thorne.

On August 14, 2018, Bregoli announced her upcoming mixtape 15. It would feature guest appearances from Lil Yachty, Ty Dolla $ign, YG, Lil Baby, City Girls, and Asian Doll. One day later, she received a gold certification from the Recording Industry Association of America for her single "Gucci Flip Flops".

On August 30, 2018, Bregoli released her new single "Yung and Bhad" featuring City Girls. Two days before the release of her debut mixtape, she released a music video for Thot Opps (Clout Drop) and Bout That. On September 18, 2018, she released 15. She released the single "Geek'd" featuring Lil Baby, with a music video released two days later. Other album tracks such as "No More Love", "Famous", "Count It" and "Shhh" were presented as video shorts on YouTube. On October 17, she released "Juice" featuring rapper YG. A music video for "Juice" was also released, with a guest appearance from UFC Women's Featherweight Champion Cris Cyborg, but YG did not appear on the video.

On November 6, 2018, she embarked on the third and fourth legs of her tour, on the west coast of the US and Australia/New Zealand respectively. The tour received good reviews, stating Bregoli's stage presence made the show, some even comparing her to Britney Spears on the early years of her career.

On November 16, controversy arose when she threw her drink at, and attempted to assault, fellow rapper Iggy Azalea while attending Cardi B's Fashion Nova launch party. Bregoli told paparazzi that she had done it due to prior comments Azalea made on Instagram, while Azalea responded with a series of tweets condemning Bregoli.

2019–present: Bringing Up Bhabie, Ride or Die and return to music
In January 2019, Bregoli released two singles: "Babyface Savage" featuring Tory Lanez and "Bestie" featuring Kodak Black. Babyface Savage gained a lot of traction in YouTube and Twitter especially, with many clips of the songs gaining tens of thousands retweets and likes. The song also charted on Canada and on the Bubbling Under Hot 100 in the US, extending her record of the youngest female to have more entries in over 20 years. The music video reached 20 million views in under 2 months. Bestie's music video, directed by Michael Garcia, came out February 25 and was praised for its visuals and storyline. It featured product placement by multiple brands and had a guest appearance by DMX.

In the same month, she announced an endorsement deal with Copycat Beauty, where she will promote the brand's products on her social media and music videos. She reportedly will be making  a percentage of the sales for the six-month deal. The deal was successful, as the company's sales spiked, reaching 500,000 on the first day.

Bregoli also released the trailer of her new reality show, Bringing Up Bhabie, which would detail her daily life and her building her music career. The show came out on Snapchat as one of their many Snap Originals. The first season had 12 episodes, and TMZ reported outstanding ratings of over 10 million unique viewers in its first 24 hours. They also reported she was set to make over 10 million dollars during 2019. During September 2019, the reality show was renewed by Snapchat for a second season due to air in Summer 2020, but later delayed due to the COVID-19 pandemic and canceled later that year.

During April and May 2019, Bregoli released a remix of "Bestie" by Spenda C Nola Bounce and a radio version of the song with Megan Thee Stallion. She released the version with Megan in order for her song to be played on the radio as radio stations were boycotting Kodak Black at the time. Bregoli also released the double singles "Lotta Dem" and her song "Spaz", which features YBN Nahmir. The making of the "Spaz" music video was recorded for her Snapchat show Bringing Up Bhabie.

The following month, she released another single called "Get Like Me", which features NLE Choppa. On August 22, 2019, she announced the release of her new game Ride or Die, which features Bregoli as an animated character where the player has to get her to run from the police.

In December 2019, a video of Bregoli wearing box braids was posted to Instagram, causing controversy over cultural appropriation and her subsequent decision to go on a social media hiatus. In February 2020, she ended her hiatus with a freestyle to Nicki Minaj's song "Yikes" and another song called "$" with Lil Gotit.
On April 22, 2020, she released her first single of 2020, titled "That's What I Said", a track addressing her critics.

On March 17, 2020, actress Skai Jackson filed a restraining order against Bregoli following a heavily documented feud in which Bregoli sent Jackson death threats and repeatedly harassed Jackson's mother on social media. Jackson dropped the restraining order on June 15.

In June, Bregoli entered a 31-day rehab facility for childhood trauma and addiction to prescription medication. She received support from celebrities such as Demi Lovato, Blac Chyna and Charli XCX.

In October, she released her second single of 2020, "Do It Like Me", which quickly went viral on the social media platform TikTok.

On April 1, 2021, six days after her eighteenth birthday, Bregoli opened an OnlyFans account, earning over $1 million in revenue in the first six hours, including over $757,000 from subscriptions, $267,000 from message payments, and $5,000 in tips. She later demonstrated evidence of earnings of more than $50 million, which was initially met with skepticism.

On April 4, TMZ reported that she and Paris Hilton were collaborating on a troubled teen program to focus on abuse experienced by teens at camps.

In September 2021, she launched her own record label, Bhad Music, where she will release her upcoming debut EP. On September 17, she released her first single of 2021, "Miss Understood", which peaked at 8 on the Billboard Digital Song Sales Chart. It is scheduled to be the lead single of her upcoming debut EP.

Discography

Mixtapes
 15 (2018)

Singles

Promotional singles

Guest appearances

Videography 
{| class="wikitable"
|Title
|Year
|Artist(s)
|Director(s)
|-
|'"These Heaux"
| rowspan="4" |2017
| rowspan="5" |Bhad Bhabie
|GOOD BOY SHADY
|-
|"Hi Bich" / "Whachu Know"
|Ronny J
|-
|"I Got It"'| rowspan="4" 
|-
|"Mama Don’t Worry (Still Ain’t Dirty)"
|-
|"Both of Em"
| rowspan="9" |2018
|-
|"Hi Bich (Remix)"
|Bhad Bhabie (featuring Rich The Kid, Asian Doll and MadeinTYO)
|-
|"Gucci Flip Flops"
|Bhad Bhabie (featuring Lil Yachty)
| rowspan="6" |Nicholaus Goosen
|-
|"Trust Me"
|Bhad Bhabie (featuring Ty Dolla $ign)
|-
|"Thot Opps (Clout Drop)" / "Bout That"
|Bhad Bhabie
|-
|"Geek’d"
|Bhad Bhabie (featuring Lil Baby)
|-
|"No More Love" / "Famous" (Short Video)
|Bhad Bhabie 
|-
|"Count It"
|Bhad Bhabie and $hirak
|-
|"Juice"
|Bhad Bhabie (featuring YG)
|Cris Cyborg
|-
|"Babyface Savage"
| rowspan="4" |2019
|Bhad Bhabie (featuring Tory Lanez)
|
|-
|"Bestie"
|Bhad Bhabie (featuring Kodak Black)
|D. A. Doman
|-
|"Get Like Me"
|Bhad Bhabie (featuring NLE Choppa)
| rowspan="2" 
|-
|"Babyface Savage" (TikTok Dance Compilation Video)
|Bhad Bhabie (featuring Tory Lanez)
|-
|"That's What I Said"
|2020
|Bhad Bhabie
|Go Grizzly
|}

Filmography
 Dr. Phil (2016-2017; 2 appearances)
 Bringing Up Bhabie'' (2019–present; main cast)

Tours

Headlining
Bhanned in the USA Tour (2018–2019)
The 2020 Tour (2020; cancelled)

Awards and nominations

Notes

References

External links
 
 

2003 births
21st-century American rappers
21st-century American women singers
21st-century American singers
21st-century women rappers
American child singers
American people of Italian descent
American people of Polish-Jewish descent
American women rappers
American YouTubers
Atlantic Records artists
Living people
OnlyFans creators
People from Boynton Beach, Florida
Rappers from Florida
Southern hip hop musicians
Trap musicians